Yacoob Omar (born 7 August 1948, in Durban) is a former South African first-class cricketer who played for Natal, mostly in Howa Bowl matches.

Omar holds the record for most runs scored in the Howa Bowl, which was known as the Dadabhay Trophy when he made a pair on first-class debut. He was also a decent right arm medium pace bowler.

In a tournament which was played on poor pitches that favoured the bowlers, Omar was one of the few players capable of making centuries and had a career best score of 174 not out, scored as captain against Eastern Province in 1975/76.

References

External links
Cricinfo: Yacoob Omar

1948 births
Living people
South African cricketers
KwaZulu-Natal cricketers